Pin billiards may refer to any of a fairly large number of billiard games that uses a , or a set of "pins" or "s". The earliest form of billiards, ground billiards, was played with a single pin called the "king". Table billiards kept the king until the mid-18th century. There are billiard games played with as many as thirteen pins.

Italian pin billiards

Pin billiards has two distinct variations of pin billiards; played with similar rules to carom billiards. The game is common across a wide area and also inspired Danish Pin Billiards.

Danish pin billiards

A Danish variation, known as Keglebillard is played on a carom sized table, however, it is also played with s. The game is unusual for billiards, as both players play with the same cue-ball, (using a red ball). A variant (usually found in social settings is known as skomager).

Bar billiards

Mostly played in Great Britain, bar billiards originated in the 1930s. It is unique in that it is played on a carom-sized table with holes in the playing surface, but none at the sides or corners. There are two types of pins a table may have: mushroom-shaped ones or pins with a needle piercing through the center. Both are designed to prevent them from falling into the holes. Knocking one over incurs a penalty. Balls falling through the holes are returned to the playing end of the table. All shots are played 'from hand'. The duration of the game is controlled by a coin-operated clockwork mechanism, which drops a bar to prevent balls returning into play.

Other games
Bottle pool is essentially a pin billiards game but instead uses a leather bottle.
Devil's pool, played in Australia, which uses obelisk-shaped pins (like over-sized dominoes) as targets and obstacles.

References

Obstacle billiards